The Alien Encounters is a 1979 science fiction film written and directed by James T. Flocker and starring Augie Tribach and Matthew Boston. It is an American B movie

Plot

An unemployed astronomer loses his job when a radio telescope is destroyed while he is hearing messages from outer space. He then tracks down a scientist who is building a machine to extend life, only to discover the scientist is dead. He visits with the scientist’s wife and son, and discovers about the scientist’s own encounter with UFOs. An alien probe which has landed on Earth from Barnard's Star. The machine known as a betatron which has remarkable rejuvenating effects.

Cast

Reception

Described by leading science fiction author David Wingrove in his Science Fiction Source Book as a "Deathly dull B-movie UFO story with dire effects and no real encounters at all...Endless desert scenes and interminable talk-overs disguise crank concerns of writer/director James T. Flocker", the film received generally poor reviews. Fantastic Movie Musings found the movie to be okay for its low budget, that it has some interesting points.

Production

Filmed in and around the Calico Mountains including Mule Canyon Road and scenes on the lake bed, off Ghost Town Road and Interstate 15, 7 miles north of Barstow, California.

References

External links 
 

Fiction set around Barnard's Star
1970s English-language films
1979 films
1970s science fiction films
American science fiction films
1970s American films